Saheb is a 2019 Gujarati film starring Malhar Thakar & Kinjal Rajpriya. The film is directed by Shailesh Prajapati and written by Paresh Vyas. The film was released on 8 February 2019.

Cast 
 Malhar Thakar as Malhar Palladia
 Kinjal Rajpriya as Mahek
 Nisarg Trivedi as Saumitra
 Prashant Barot as Jayanti Bhai
 Parikshit Tamaliya as Chintu

Soundtrack 
The songs of the film are composed by Amar Khandha.

Reception 
Saheb received good reviews from critics; The Times of India gave 3.5/5 stars.

References

External links 
 

2019 films
2010s Gujarati-language films
Films set in Ahmedabad
Films shot in Ahmedabad
Films shot in Gujarat